Dowa is a town located in the Central Region of Malawi. It is the administrative capital of Dowa District. William Kamkwamba, author of The Boy Who Harnessed the Wind: Creating Currents of Electricity and Hope, was born and raised in Dowa.

Climate
Dowa has a subtropical highland climate (Köppen: Cwb).

Demographics

References

Populated places in Central Region, Malawi